Disneymania is an American series of compilation albums of Disney songs covered by mainstream pop and/or Disney Channel artists singing their own rendition or version of the song. As of 2010, nine Disneymania albums (two being side-albums) have been released. The albums are no longer being produced.

Discography

Sequential albums

Other albums

Commonly used songs
The following is a list of songs that appear on more than one Disneymania CD.

A Dream Is a Wish Your Heart Makes
 Daniel Bedingfield (DM 2)
 Kimberley Locke (DM 3)
 Disney Channel Circle of Stars (DM 4)
 Nikki Blonsky (DM 6)

A Whole New World
 Sweetbox (DM 1) *Bonus track
 LMNT (DM 2)
 Nick Lachey and Jessica Simpson (DM 3)

Can You Feel the Love Tonight
 S Club (DM 1)
 Sara Paxton (DM 4)
 Elliott Yamin (DM 6)

Circle of Life
 Ronan Keating (DM 1)
 Disney Channel Circle of Stars (DM 2)
 (All Star Remix) Disney Channel Circle of Stars (DRM)

Colors of the Wind
 Ashanti feat. Lil' sis Shi Shi (DM 1)
 Christy Carlson Romano (DM 3)
 (Soul Sister Remix) Ashanti feat. Lil' sis Shi Shi (DRM)
 Vanessa Hudgens (DM 5)

Cruella de Vil
 Lalaine (DM 3)
 (DJ Skribble Spot Remix) Lalaine (DRM)
 Skye Sweetnam (DM 4) *Bonus track
 Hayden Panettiere (DM 5)
 Selena Gomez (DM 6)

Go the Distance
 K-Ci & JoJo (DM 4) *Bonus track
 Lucas Grabeel (DM 5)

Hakuna Matata
 Baha Men (DM 1)
 Debby Ryan (DM 7)

Hawaiian Roller Coaster Ride
 Jump5 (DM 3)
 (Mahalo Remix) Jump5 (DRM)
 Baha Men (DM 4)

I Just Can't Wait to Be King
 Aaron Carter (DM 1)
 Allstar Weekend (DM 7)

I Wan'na Be Like You
 Smash Mouth (DM 1)
 Nikki Webster (DM 2) *Bonus track
 (Monkey C Remix) Smash Mouth (DRM)
 Jonas Brothers (DM 5)

I Won't Say (I'm in Love)
 The Cheetah Girls (DM 3)
 (Grrl Power Remix) The Cheetah Girls (DRM)

If I Never Knew You
 The Cheetah Girls (DM 4)
 Tiffany Thornton (DM 7)

It's a Small World
 Baha Men (DM 2)
 (RapMania! Mix) fan_3 (DM 3)
 (Shorty Remix) Baha Men (DRM)

Kiss the Girl
 No Secrets (DM 1)
 Vitamin C (DM 3)
 Ashley Tisdale (DM 5)
 Colbie Caillat (DM 6)

Once Upon a Dream
 No Secrets (DM 2)
 Emily Osment (PDM)

Part of Your World
 Jessica Simpson (DM 1)
 Skye Sweetnam (DM 3)
 (C-Girl Rock Remix) Skye Sweetnam (DRM)
 Miley Cyrus (DM 5)
 Anna Maria Perez de Taglé (DM 7)

Real Gone
 Billy Ray Cyrus (DM 6)
 Honor Society (DM 7)

Reflection
 Christina Aguilera (DM 1)
 (Remix) Christina Aguilera (DM 4)
 Everlife (DM 5)
 Keke Palmer (DM 6)

Some Day My Prince Will Come
 Anastacia (DM 1)
 Ashley Tisdale feat. Drew Seeley (DM 4)
 The Cheetah Girls (DM 6)

Strangers Like Me
 Everlife (DM 3)
 (Jungle Rock Remix) Everlife (DRM)

The Bare Necessities
 Bowling for Soup (DM 3)
 (Jungle Boogie Remix) Bowling for Soup (DRM)

The Second Star to the Right
 Jesse McCartney (DM 2)
 (Lost Boys Remix) Jesse McCartney (DRM)
 T-Squad (DM 5)

The Siamese Cat Song
 Hilary & Haylie Duff (DM 2)
 (Cat-Scratch Remix) Hilary & Haylie Duff (DRM)
 B5 (DM 5)

True to Your Heart
 Raven (DM 2)
 (China Doll Remix) Raven (DRM)
 Keke Palmer (DM 5)

Under the Sea
 A*Teens (DM 1)
 Raven-Symoné (DM 3)
 (Reggae Remix) Raven-Symoné (DRM)
 Booboo Stewart (DM 7)

When She Loved Me
 Jordan Pruitt (DM 5)
 Bridgit Mendler (DM 7)

When You Wish Upon a Star
 *NSYNC (DM 1)
 Ashley Gearing (DM 2)
 Jesse McCartney (DM 3)
 Kate Voegele (DM 6)

You'll Be in My Heart
 Usher (DM 1)
 Teddy Geiger (DM 4)
 Drew Seeley (DM 6)

Zip-a-Dee-Doo-Dah
 Stevie Brock (DM 2)
 Aly & AJ (DM 3)
 Miley Cyrus (DM 4)

Most artist appearances
Artists who have appeared the most across all Disneymania albums:
 Raven-Symoné: eight songs (included three as part of "Disney Channel Circle of Stars")
 The Cheetah Girls: six songs
 Hilary Duff: five songs (included two as part of "Disney Channel Circle of Stars")
 Anneliese van der Pol: four songs (included three as part of "Disney Channel Circle of Stars")
 Baha Men: four songs
 Drew Seeley: four songs
 Everlife: four songs
 Jesse McCartney: four songs
 Jump5: four songs
 Orlando Brown: four songs (included three as part of "Disney Channel Circle of Stars")
 Ashley Tisdale: three songs (included one as part of "Disney Channel Circle of Stars")
 Christy Carlson Romano: three songs (included two as part of "Disney Channel Circle of Stars")
 Disney Channel Circle of Stars: three songs
 Kyla Pratt: three songs (as part of "Disney Channel Circle of Stars")
 Lalaine: three songs
 Skye Sweetnam: three songs
 Jessica Simpson: two songs
 Miley Cyrus: two songs

See also
 Radio Disney
 We Love Disney

References

External links 
 

 
Covers albums
Walt Disney Records compilation albums